The Bamali language, Chopechop, is a Grassfields Bantu language of Cameroon.

References

Languages of Cameroon
Nun languages